Torpen International Boats are the manufacturers of the Multi 23 trimaran sailboat, designed by French firm VPLP. The boats are manufactured in Qingdao, Shandong province, China.

See also
Trimaran
VPLP

References

Boat builders
Manufacturing companies based in Qingdao
Trimarans